The Cisco Springs Oil and Gas Field is located in Grand County, Utah at .

Current operators 

The Cisco Springs field is currently operated by Running Foxes Petroleum, Inc. a Denver, Colorado-based independent company.  Running Foxes owns 100% of the field. The field at present primarily produces oil from the Dakota 1 sand located along the western flank of a northwest plunging anticline that is crosscut by northeast trending faults.  Gas production has temporarily ceased due to low product prices.

External links
US Energy Information Administration:  Uinta-Piceance Basin oil and gas fields

Geography of Grand County, Utah
Natural gas fields in the United States
Oil fields in Utah
Buildings and structures in Grand County, Utah